The Severn River, a perennial river that forms part of the Border Rivers group, is part of the Macintyre catchment of the Murray-Darling basin, located in the Darling Downs region of Queensland, Australia.

Course and features
The river flows generally south by west, through the Sundown National Park, and forms its confluence with the Dumaresq River near the Tenterfield Creek and Glenlyon Dam Road, east of the settlement of Riverside. From the point where the rivers form their confluence marks part of the border between Queensland and New South Wales. The Dumaresq flows into the Macintyre River. The Queensland branch of the Severn River is often noted as the ultimate source of the Darling River. The Severn River descends  over its  course.

River Red Gums, she-oaks, melaleucas and bottlebrushes can all be found along the river.

See also

Severn River (New South Wales)

References

Rivers of Queensland
Murray-Darling basin
Darling Downs
Southern Downs Region